Kristian Dirks Riis (born 17 February 1997) is a Danish professional footballer who plays as a centre-back for Danish Superliga club Lyngby Boldklub.

Club career

Early career
Riis started career at the local club Haderslev FK. Later, he joined SønderjyskE, playing there until 2011, before joining FC Midtjylland at the age of 15 in 2011. He started playing for their U17 team, was later promoted to the U19 team later, and finally to the first team squad in 2016.

Midtjylland
Riis was promoted to the first team squad in the summer 2016 at the age of 19, signing a five-year professional contract on 14 June 2016.

Riis made his official debut for Midtjylland at the age of 19 on 31 July 2016, in a Danish Superliga match against Silkeborg IF. Riis played the whole match, which his club won 3–0.

After surprisingly being selected to represent the Danish under-21s in early April 2017, he suffered an injury which ruled him out. It was a knee injury that would keep him out for 4–5 weeks.

Loan to Vendsyssel
On 31 August 2017, Riis was loaned out to the Danish 1st Division club Vendsyssel FF for the rest of the season. During his time at the club, he played a big role in Vendsyssel FF's promotion to the 2018–19 Danish Superliga. He played a total of 26 games for the club and scored one goal.

Loan to Esbjerg
On 21 August 2018, Esbjerg fB announced the signing of Riis on a loan deal for the rest of the season.

After an injury plagued time at the club with only one game played, Midtjylland decided to recall him on 25 March 2019.

Lyngby
After having only played nine minutes of football throughout the 2020–21 season at Midtjylland, Riis left the club and instead joined newly relegated Danish 1st Division club, Lyngby Boldklub, on 1 July 2021. Riis signed a two-year deal. Riis had a strong first season at Lyngby, helping the team win promotion back to the Danish Superliga for the 2022–23 season with 25 appearances and one goal. Riis played the first eight games of the 2022–23 season, before suffering a torn meniscus in early September 2022, which required surgery and an injury break for the rest of 2022.

Career statistics

Honours
Midtjylland
 Danish Superliga: 2019–20
 Danish Cup: 2018–19

References

External links
 

1997 births
Living people
Danish men's footballers
Denmark youth international footballers
Association football defenders
People from Haderslev Municipality
Danish Superliga players
Danish 1st Division players
SønderjyskE Fodbold players
FC Midtjylland players
Vendsyssel FF players
Esbjerg fB players
Lyngby Boldklub players
Sportspeople from the Region of Southern Denmark